Pehr Evind Svinhufvud af Qvalstad (15 December 1861 – 29 February 1944) was the third president of Finland from 1931 to 1937. Serving as a lawyer, judge, and politician in the Russian Grand Duchy of Finland, he played a major role in the movement for Finnish independence, he was one who presented the Declaration of Independence to the Parliament. In 1917–1918, Svinhufvud was the first Head of State of independent Finland, first as Chairman of the Senate and subsequently as Protector of State or Regent. He also served as Prime Minister from 1930 to 1931.

As a conservative and nationalist who was strong in his opposition to communism and the Left in general, Svinhufvud did not become a President embraced by all the people, although as the amiable Ukko-Pekka ("Old Man Pekka"), he did enjoy wide popularity. Svinhufvud's sharp line as a defender of Finland's legal rights during the period of autonomy was especially valued from the 1920s until the end of the World War II, unlike in later decades. Ever since communism and the Soviet Union collapsed in the early 1990s, appreciation of Svinhufvud has begun to increase.

Family background and early life
Pehr Evind Svinhufvud af Qvalstad was born in Sääksmäki. He was the son of Pehr Gustaf Svinhufvud af Qvalstad, a sea captain, and Olga von Becker. His father drowned at sea off Greece in 1863, when Pehr Evind was only two years old. He spent his early childhood at the home of his paternal grandfather, Per Gustaf Svinhufvud af Qvalstad (a provincial treasurer of Häme), at Rapola, where the family had lived for five generations. The Svinhufvuds (literally translated as "Swine-head") are a Finland-Swedish noble family tracing their history back to Dalarna, Sweden. Pehr Gustaf Svinhufvud af Qvalstad, an army lieutenant in the reign of Charles XII, had moved from there to Rapola after the Great Northern War. The family had been ennobled in Sweden in 1574, and it was also introduced to the Finnish House of Nobility in 1818. Rapola was sold when his grandfather shot himself in 1866, and Svinhufvud moved to Helsinki with his mother and his sister.

He attended the Swedish-language high school in Helsinki. In 1878, at the age of 16, he enrolled at the Imperial Alexander University of Helsinki. There he gained a Bachelor's degree in 1881, and then completed a Master of Arts degree in 1882; his main subjects being Finnish, Russian and Scandinavian History. After this, he took a Master of Laws degree, graduating in 1886. In 1889, Svinhufvud married Alma (Ellen) Timgren (1869–1953). They had six children, Yngve (1890–1991), Ilmo Gretel (1892–1969), Aino Mary (1893–1980), Eino (1896–1938), Arne (1904–1942), and Veikko (1908–1969).

A lawyer and a politician
Svinhufvud's career in law followed a regular course: he worked as a lawyer, served at district courts, and served as a deputy judge at the Turku Court of Appeal. In 1892 he was appointed as a member of the Senate's law-drafting committee at the relatively young age of 31. For six years he worked in the committee, initially redrafting taxation laws. As head of his family, Svinhufvud participated as a member of the Estate of Nobles in the Diet of Finland in 1894 and 1899–1906.

He found his work on the law-drafting committee tedious and moved to the Court of Appeal as an assistant judge in 1902, his long-term goal being the easy life of a rural judge. Svinhufvud stayed mainly in the background until 1899, when Imperial Russia initiated a Russification policy for the autonomous Grand Duchy. The Finnish answer was mainly legislative and constitutional resistance, of which Svinhufvud became a central figure as a judge in the Court of Appeals.

When some inhabitants of Helsinki lodged a complaint with the Turku Court of Appeal in 1902, concerning violence employed by the Russian Governor of Uusimaa to break up a demonstration against military call-ups, the court initiated proceedings against Governor-General Bobrikov. Bobrikov demanded that they be stopped, and when this did not happen, he used a decree which the Finns regarded as illegal to dismiss sixteen officials of the court, including Svinhufvud.

Originally a moderate of the Finnish Party or Old Finnish Party, after his dismissal Svinhufvud became a strict constitutionalist who regarded the resistance of judges and officials as a question of justice, not believing that political expediency offered compromises. He moved to Helsinki to work as a lawyer and participated in the political activities both of the Diet and of a secret society, Kagal.

Svinhufvud played a key role in the birth of a new parliamentary system in 1905 and he was elected as a Young Finnish Party member of the new Parliament in 1906. Svinhufvud went on to serve as a member of Parliament on four occasions (1907–1908, 1908–1914, 1917, and 1930–1931).

After being appointed as a judge in Heinola in 1906, he attempted to keep out of the front line of politics. However he was elected Speaker of the Parliament in 1907, largely because the majority Social Democrats considered him "the best-known opponent of illegality". Svinhufvud's parliamentary opening speeches, in which he laid emphasis on legality, led to the Tsar dissolving Parliament in both 1909 and 1910. He served as Speaker until 1912. Svinhufvud also served as a judge in Lappee 1908–1914.

During the First World War Russia replaced various Finnish officials with Russians. Svinhufvud refused to obey the orders of the Russian procurator Konstantin Kazansky, which he considered illegal, and this led to his removal from office as a judge and being exiled to Tomsk in Siberia in November 1914. In his Siberian exile, he spent his time hunting and mending his clothes, still keeping secret contact with the independence movement. When he left Finland, he had promised to return "with the help of God and Hindenburg". When news of the February Revolution reached Svinhufvud, he walked to the town's police station and bluntly announced, "The person who sent me here has been arrested. Now I'm going home." In Helsinki he was greeted as a national hero.

Independence and the Civil War

Svinhufvud was appointed as Chairman of the Senate on 27 November 1917, and was a key figure in the announcement of Finland's declaration of independence on 6 December 1917. He also personally went to Saint Petersburg with Carl Enckell and Gustaf Idman to meet Vladimir Ilyich Lenin, who gave his official recognition of Finnish independence. This is how the meeting is told in Svinhufvud's biography Svinhufvud ja itsenäisyyssenaatti written by Erkki Räikkönen: 

Svinhufvud's Senate also authorized General Mannerheim to form a new Finnish army on the basis on White Guard, the (chiefly Rightist) volunteer militia called the Suojeluskunta, an act simultaneously coinciding with the beginning of the Civil War in Finland.

During the Civil War, Svinhufvud went underground in Helsinki and sent pleas for intervention to Germany and Sweden. The conflict also turned him into an active monarchist, though not a royalist. In March 1918 he managed to escape via Berlin-Stockholm to the Senate, now located in Vaasa, where he resumed his function as Head of Government. In this role he pardoned 36,000 Red prisoners in the autumn of 1918. On 18 May, Svinhufvud became Protector of State or Regent, retaining this post as Head of State after he stood down as Chairman of the Senate on 27 May.

After Germany's defeat in World War I, and the failed attempt to make Finland a Monarchy under the King of Finland (Frederick Charles of Hesse was elected), Svinhufvud withdrew from public life and was active only in the anti-communist Suojeluskunta militia.

Prime Minister and President

In 1925 he was the Presidential candidate for the conservative Kokoomus party, but was not elected. After the emergence of the anti-communist Lapua Movement, President Relander appointed him as Prime Minister of Finland on the Lapua Movement's insistence. Svinhufvud was elected President in 1931, and appointed Mannerheim as Chairman of the Defence Council, not least of all as an answer to the Lapua Movement's fear of having fought the Civil War in vain.

He resisted both communist agitation and the Lapua Movement's exploits. All Communist members of parliament were arrested. In February 1932 there was a so-called Mäntsälä Rebellion, when the Suojeluskunta-Militia and the Lapua Movement demanded the Cabinet's resignation. The turning point came with the President's broadcast radio speech, in which he called on the rebels to surrender and ordered all Civil Guard members who were heading for Mäntsälä to return to their homes:

 His speech stopped the rebellion before anything serious happened.

Svinhufvud was not a supporter of Parliamentarism, or to put it differently, he believed that the President had a right to choose the Cabinet ministers after first consulting the parliamentary parties. Evidence of this semi-presidential attitude was the minority government of Toivo M. Kivimäki, which survived for 3 years and 10 months (December 1932 – October 1936). Svinhufvud strongly supported it, because he believed that it could effectively fight the Great Depression (which it did, generally speaking), he believed that Kivimäki had a strong personality like himself, and possibly because he hoped that the Agrarians and Swedish People's Party would let the Kivimäki government remain in office as a lesser evil, the greater evil being an Agrarian-Social Democratic government.

On the other hand, when a right-wing Conservative member of Parliament, Edwin Linkomies, proposed in 1934 that Finland abandon parliamentarism in favour of a government led by the President and that the President be given an absolute veto power over the laws passed by the Parliament, Svinhufvud opposed his ideas. In Svinhufvud's opinion, the Finnish President had enough power to lead the country, provided that the President had a strong personality. He believed it to be better for Finland if the Social Democrats could be kept outside of the Cabinet. In his opinion, they would implement too radical reforms that would lead the Finnish society into chaos or Marxism. On the other hand, he was realistic enough to admit privately to the German Ambassador to Finland, Wipert von Blücher, that if he was re-elected, he would be unable to keep the Social Democrats in the opposition.

They were, after all, Finland's largest political party with over 40% of the deputies (see, for example, Seppo Zetterberg et al., ed., "A Small Giant of the Finnish History" / Suomen historian pikkujättiläinen, Helsinki: Werner Söderström Publications Ltd., 2003; Virkkunen, "The Finnish Presidents I"). It was due to this that, in the Presidential election of 1937, the Social Democrats and the Agrarian party voted against him. He was not re-elected.

At the end of Winter War, he unsuccessfully sought audience with both Adolf Hitler and Benito Mussolini but met only Pope Pius XII. During the Continuation War he supported the idea of an expansionistic war.

Svinhufvud's most important and beloved hobbies were hunting and precision shooting. His grandson Jorma Svinhufvud describes: 

Svinhufvud died at Luumäki in 1944, while Finland was seeking peace with the Soviet Union.

He refused to Finnicize the name of his 500-year-old noble house.

Cabinets
 Pehr Evind Svinhufvud's first senate
 Svinhufvud II Cabinet

Honours

Awards and decorations

  : Grand Cross with Collar of the Order of the White Rose (Finland) (1927)
  : Grand Cross of the Order of the Cross of Liberty (1918)
  : Collar of the Order of the White Lion, Czechoslovakia (12 December 1931)
  : Knight of the Order of the Seraphim, Sweden (3 December 1932)
  : Order of the White Eagle
  : Order of the Cross of the Eagle
  : Order of Merit of the Kingdom of Hungary
  : Chain of the Order of Muhammad Ali (1936)
  : Grand Gross with Collar of the Order of the Three Stars (14 December 1931)

In popular culture 
Svinhufvud appears as one of the main characters in the 1976 Finnish-Soviet historical drama film Trust, directed by Viktor Tregubovich and Edvin Laine, which portrays the events leading up to the Finnish Declaration of Independence from Russia in 1917. In the film, Svinhufvud was played by Vilho Siivola.

See also 

 Finnish Declaration of Independence
 Ukko-Pekka (locomotive)

Sources

Literature 
 Erkki Räikkönen: Svinhufvudin kertomukset Siperiasta. Otava, 1928.
 Erkki Räikkönen: Ukko-Pekka Siperiassa: pastorinrouva Johanna von Hörschelmannin päiväkirjan kertomus presidentti P. E. Svinhufvudin Siperian-matkan vaiheista. Otava, 1931.
 Erkki Räikkönen: Suuri juhlapäivä: onnittelut ja kunnianosoitukset tasavallan presidentin P. E. Svinhufvudin täyttäessä 70 vuotta. Otava, 1932.
 Martti Häikiö: Suomen leijona: Svinhufvud itsenäisyysmiehenä. Docendo, 2017.

References

External links 

 Pehr Evind Svinhufvud in 375 humanists – 4 June 2015. Faculty of Arts, University of Helsinki.
 Pehr Evind Svinhufvud at National Biography of Finland 
 Also available in Swedish: 
 
 P. E. Svinhufvud in The Presidents of Finland

1861 births
1944 deaths
People from Valkeakoski
People from Häme Province (Grand Duchy of Finland)
Finnish anti-communists
Finnish Lutherans
Swedish-speaking Finns
Finnish people of Swedish descent
20th-century Finnish nobility
Young Finnish Party politicians
National Coalition Party politicians
Presidents of Finland
Regents
Finnish senators
Prime Ministers of Finland
Members of the Diet of Finland
Speakers of the Parliament of Finland
Members of the Parliament of Finland (1907–08)
Members of the Parliament of Finland (1908–09)
Members of the Parliament of Finland (1909–10)
Members of the Parliament of Finland (1910–11)
Members of the Parliament of Finland (1911–13)
Members of the Parliament of Finland (1913–16)
Members of the Parliament of Finland (1916–17)
Members of the Parliament of Finland (1930–33)
Chancellors of Justice of Finland
People of the Finnish Civil War (White side)
19th-century Finnish nobility
University of Helsinki alumni
Grand Crosses of the Order of the Cross of Liberty
Finnish independence activists
Anti-Russification activists
Collars of the Order of the White Lion
Recipients of the Order of the White Eagle (Poland)